The Yocto Project is a Linux Foundation collaborative open source project whose goal is to produce tools and processes that enable the creation of Linux distributions for embedded and IoT software that are independent of the underlying architecture of the embedded hardware. The project was announced by the Linux Foundation in 2010 and launched in March, 2011, in collaboration with 22 organizations, including OpenEmbedded.

The Yocto Project's focus is on improving the software development process for embedded Linux distributions. The Yocto Project provides interoperable tools, metadata, and processes that enable the rapid, repeatable development of Linux-based embedded systems in which every aspect of the development process can be customized.

In October 2018, Arm Holdings partnered with Intel in order to share code for embedded systems through the Yocto Project.

Project scope 
The Yocto Project has the aim and objective of attempting to improve the lives of developers of customized Linux systems supporting the ARM, MIPS, PowerPC and x86/x86-64 architectures. A key part of this is the OpenEmbedded build system, which enables developers to create their own Linux distribution specific to their environment. The Yocto Project and OpenEmbedded Project share maintainership of the main parts of the OpenEmbedded build system: the build engine, BitBake, and the core metadata, OpenEmbedded-Core. The Yocto Project provides a reference implementation called Poky, which contains the OpenEmbedded build system plus a large set of recipes, arranged in a hierarchical system of layers, that can be used as a fully functional template for a customized embedded operating system.

There are several other sub-projects under the project umbrella which include CROPS, pseudo, the matchbox suite of applications, and many others. One of the central goals of the project is interoperability among these tools.

The project offers different sized targets from "tiny" to fully featured images which are configurable and customisable by the end user. The project encourages interaction with upstream projects and has contributed heavily to OpenEmbedded-Core and BitBake as well as to numerous upstream projects, including the Linux kernel. The resulting images are typically useful in systems where embedded Linux would be used, these being single-use focused systems or systems without the usual screens/input devices associated with desktop Linux systems.

As well as building Linux systems, there is also an ability to generate a toolchain for cross compilation and a software development kit (SDK) tailored to their own distribution. The project tries to be software and vendor agnostic. Thus, for example, it is possible to select which package manager format to use (deb, rpm, or ipk).

Within builds, there are options for various build-time sanity/regression tests, and also the option to boot and test certain images under QEMU to validate the build.

The project is known for making good documentation a priority and attempts to update documentation for each release, retaining all documents for current and archived releases on the website, as the documentation can change significantly with any release.

Governance 
The Yocto Project is one of many collaborative projects organized as a non-profit under the banner of the Linux Foundation.

The project's governance is divided loosely into administrative and technical arms, although many members participate in both camps.

At a technical level, the project is overseen by the project architect Richard Purdie (a Linux Foundation Fellow) who has a long history of involvement with many of the project's components and technologies. The architect maintains a hierarchy of maintainers for the different components of the system, much as the Linux kernel is maintained.

The administrative arm consists of an advisory board made up of representatives from the project's member organizations, including several major silicon vendors, commercial operating system vendors that use Yocto Project as their upstream, corporate users, as well as representatives from groups such as software consultants and community members. The member organizations of this board provide resources to the project. There are also several advisory board working groups that handle administrative functions for the project such as finance, infrastructure, advocacy and outreach, and community management.

Releases
Major releases occur about every 6 months (April and October).

Version 3.1 was the first Long-term_support (LTS) release, initially supported for two years. Since then, a new LTS release is added every two years.

In 2021, support for version 3.1 was extended to two more years  until 2024. This was done as an experiment, and to leave time to switch to the newer LTS version, but was not a commitment to do the same for all LTS releases.

Branding Program 
The Yocto Project Branding Program provides an opportunity to associate the value of using the Yocto Project with a company or product. The Yocto Project Branding Program defines steps to register organizations as Yocto Project Participants, and content as Yocto Project Compatible. Yocto Project Participant is appropriate for organizations who use and support the Yocto Project publicly. Yocto Project Compatible is appropriate for products, BSPs, and other OE-compatible layers, and related open-source projects, and is open to Yocto Project member organizations.

See also 
 Buildroot

References

External links 
 
 Deciding between Buildroot and Yocto, LWN.net, April 6, 2016, by Nathan Willis

Build automation
Embedded Linux
Linux Foundation projects